The White Wolves was a British neo-Nazi and white supremacist terrorist organisation that claimed to adhere to the doctrine of leaderless resistance, which claimed responsibility for several racially motivated bombings in London in 1999.

"The White Wolves is a tiny secretive group of nazi fanatics organised in cells. It first came to attention in 1994 when it issued a 'blueprint for terror' in which it set out the events now being played out in London. Copying the concept of "leaderless resistance" from American far-right extremists, they formed small cells and planned terror bombings and cold- blooded murder." The anonymous 15 page 1994 blueprint for terror – which announced the formation of the White Wolves, contained practical instructions on bomb making, and which called for a race war<ref>https://www.newsweek.com/hatred-london-166706 Susan Greenberg, Newsweek", 5 September 1999</ref> – has been widely attributed to the then neo-nazi ideologue David Myatt.

Mike Whine, head of the Board of Jewish Deputies theorised that the White Wolves were a splinter group of Combat 18, deriving their name from a Serbian paramilitary formation.

London bombs
Around the time of the Brixton nail-bomb, 25 people received stenciled notes stating:

At the time of the bombings, police authorities believed that former Combat 18 second-in-command Del O'Connor was the likely head of the White Wolves. A stencilled message had been circulated reading C18 did not carry out the Brixton bombing. We, the White Wolves, did.''

Arrest
In May 1999, a 22-year-old, David Copeland, was arrested and charged with all three nail-bombings.

References

1999 crimes in the United Kingdom
1999 in London
Neo-Nazi organisations in the United Kingdom
Organizations that oppose LGBT rights
Racially motivated violence in England
Terrorist incidents in London